Javier Sánchez was the defending champion, but lost in the semifinals to Marcelo Filippini.

Marcelo Ríos won the title by defeating Filippini 6–2, 6–4 in the final.

Seeds

Draw

Finals

Top half

Bottom half

References

External links
 Official results archive (ATP)
 Official results archive (ITF)

Bologna Outdoor
1995 ATP Tour